Junior's Cookin is the debut album led by American jazz saxophonist Junior Cook which was recorded in 1961 for the Jazzland label.

Reception

The AllMusic review by Jim Todd stated: "The result, while not essential listening, is a satisfying and honest set that provides an appealing portrait of both Cook and Mitchell, two central, although not seminal, figures in the development of hard bop."

Track listing
 "Myzar" (Roland Alexander) – 7:12
 "Turbo Village" (Charles Davis) – 5:43
 "Easy Living" (Ralph Rainger, Leo Robin) – 6:11     
 "Blue Farouq" (Blue Mitchell) – 3:53     
 "Sweet Cakes" (Mitchell) – 5:26     
 "Field Day" (Dolo Coker) – 3:55     
 "Pleasure Bent" (Alexander) – 6:26  
Recorded at Gold Star Studios in Long Beach, California on April 10, 1961 (tracks 4–6) and New York City on December 4, 1961 (tracks 1–3 & 7)

Personnel 
Junior Cook – tenor saxophone
Blue Mitchell – trumpet
Ronnie Mathews – piano (tracks 1–3, 7)
Dolo Coker – piano (tracks 4–6)
Gene Taylor – bass
Roy Brooks – drums

References 

1961 debut albums
Junior Cook albums
Jazzland Records (1960) albums
Albums produced by Orrin Keepnews
Albums recorded at Gold Star Studios